The 247th Battalion, CEF was a unit in the Canadian Expeditionary Force during the First World War. Based in Peterborough, Ontario, the unit began recruiting in the late summer of 1916 in the townships of Peterborough, West Hastings, and Gavan. The unit was absorbed into the 235th Battalion, CEF while still in Canada.  The 247th Battalion, CEF had one Officer Commanding: Lieut-Col. C. H. Ackerman.

References
Meek, John F. Over the Top! The Canadian Infantry in the First World War. Orangeville, Ont.: The Author, 1971.

Battalions of the Canadian Expeditionary Force
Prince of Wales Rangers (Peterborough Regiment)